Intha umbilicalis is a species of air-breathing freshwater snail, an aquatic pulmonate gastropod in the ram's horn snail family, Planorbidae.

Distribution 
This species is found in:
 Sri Lanka
 India (Andhra Pradesh, Assam, Bihar, Delhi, Jammu-Kashmir, Madhya Pradesh, Maharashtra, Manipur, Orissa, Rajasthan, Uttaranchal, Uttar Pradesh, West Bengal)
 Nepal
 Bangladesh
 China
 Taiwan
 Myanmar
 Cambodia
 Laos
 Thailand
 Vietnam
 Malaysia
 Indonesia
 Philippines
 Papua New Guinea

Ecology
Parasites of Intha umbilicalis include:
 Fasciolopsis buski
 Paragonimus westermani
 Gastrodiscoides hominis
 Cercaria helicorbisi

References

External links

 Brandt R. A. M. (1974). "The non-marine aquatic Mollusca of Thailand". Archiv für Molluskenkunde 105(1-4): 1-423.
 Subba Rao N. V. (1989). Handbook: Freshwater Molluscs of India. Zoological Survey of India, Culcutta.

Planorbidae
Taxa named by William Henry Benson